Bad of the Heart may refer to:

  Bad of the Heart (album), an album by George Lamond
 "Bad of the Heart" (song), a song from the album